George Schley (January 27, 1813 – April 11, 1890) was an American politician.

Schley, the eldest child of Frederick A. and Eliza A. (McCannon) Schley, was born in Frederick, Maryland, January 27, 1813, and entered Yale College at the beginning of the Sophomore year. After leaving Yale in 1830 he spent two and a half years at the University of Virginia, in the Schools of Ancient and Modern Languages.  He read law in his father's office in Frederick, was admitted to the bar in 1837, and began the practice of law in Frederick. In 1838 he was elected to the Maryland State Legislature, and in May, 1839, he removed to Hagerstown, where his career made him one of the most widely known citizens of Western Maryland. He was a member of the State Constitutional Convention of 1850.  In 1852 he was elected to the Maryland State Senate, and served for two terms. In 1862 he declined a nomination for US Congress. He was President of the First National Bank of Hagerstown from 1873 until his death.  He died suddenly at his residence in Hagerstown, April 11, 1890, in his 78th year.  In June, 1839, he married Mary S., daughter of Thomas B. Hall, Esq., who died suddenly in Boston, Mass., while on a visit to a married daughter, in January, 1880. His only son died in early manhood.

External links 
 

1813 births
1890 deaths
People from Frederick, Maryland
Yale College alumni
University of Virginia alumni
Maryland lawyers
American bank presidents
Members of the Maryland House of Delegates
Maryland state senators
19th-century American politicians
American lawyers admitted to the practice of law by reading law
19th-century American lawyers
19th-century American businesspeople